Bettie de Jong (born May 1, 1933 in Sumatra, Indonesia) is a Dutch rehearsal director and former lead dancer at the Paul Taylor Dance Company. In November 2007 Bettie de Jong received the Dance Magazine Award to recognize her contributions to dance.

Early years
De Jong was born in Tanjungbalai on Sumatra and moved to the Netherlands in 1946. After Indonesia she continued her early training in dance and mime in Wageningen. De Jong lived for more than 35 years with her husband Victor Laredo.

Career
Her first professional engagement was with the Netherlands Pantomime Company. After coming to New York in 1958 to study at the Martha Graham Center of Contemporary Dance, she performed with the Martha Graham Dance Company, the Pearl Lang Dance Theater, John Butler and Lucas Hoving and was seen on CBS with Rudolf Nureyev in a duet choreographed by choreographer Paul Tayor.

Paul Taylor Dance Company

Bettie de Jong joined the Taylor Company in 1962. Noted for her strong stage presence and long line, she was Paul Taylor's favorite dancing partner and, as Rehearsal Director, has been his right arm for the past 35 years. Bettie de Jong belonged to the best dancers in USA and finished her active dancing career in 1985. During those 24 years Paul Taylor set 24 parts in these dances for her:
 Tracer
 Piece Period
 La Negra
 Scudorama
 Party Mix
 The Red Room
 9 Dances With Music by Corelli
 From Sea To Shining Sea
 Post Meridian
 Orbs
 Lento
 Public Domain
 Churchyard
 Foreign Exchange
 Big Bertha
 Book of Beasts
 Fetes
 Guests of May
 Noah's Minstrels
 American Genesis
 Esplanade
 Cloven Kingdom
 Le Sacre du Printemps (The Rehearsal)
 House of Cards

Nine Variations on a Dance Theme
In Nine Variations on a Dance Theme from 1966/1967, filmed by Hilary Harris, Bettie de Jong performed the same dance nine times, starting and ending in a recline position. As the film proceeds the camera becomes more and more adventurous. The film was shown at the Museum of Modern Art for a very long time as an example for dance film-making.

References

1933 births
Living people
Dutch female dancers
People from Sumatra
Contemporary dancers